Vidayutham is a 2016 Indian Tamil film directed by Nagamaneci. The film stars Tanvi Ganesh Lonkar, Kaushik Ram and Nagamaneci in the lead roles. This film is produced by Sree Nagaraja Sarpayaakshi Films and Nagamaneci Entertainments Private Ltd. The film was theatrically released on 18 March 2016.

Plot 
The film unfolds through a journey where one faces the consequence when two people meet each other. Devathai, who is the daughter of the ex-minister Chitravel comes across her first love Kaushik at her grandmother's death. She starts her love adventure to know more about Kaushik. Meanwhile, her elder sister Nithya develops a relationship with her father's rival Paddi Alandhan's son Prakash. A special investigating officer Nagaraj is set to unravel the clues and in his investigation, he gradually realizes that it is not any man behind this, but it is the power of the Demon force (Ghost) that was leading to these gruesome murders, which cannot been seen or heard.

while  getting deeper  into investigation he gets to know the reason behind the ghost doing this and from where and why has this ghost been originated, trying to get solution over this problems, he gets  to know the Nagraja temple in Nagarcoil and the power behind that, in that temple there is a Five head snake and  the mud  that comes out From Five Head Snake is the "prasdam" for that temple and it is really powerful, if any ones applies that "Prasdam" on their forehead then no evil, sprit, or ghost will touch or come near them, and using the power of this temple he is able to destroy the demonic force (Ghost) thus succeeding making the ghost flee.

Cast
Nakamaneci as Nagaraj
Tanvi Ganesh Lonkar as Devathai
Ram Saravana as Kaushik
Dhandapani as Paddi Alandhan
Chidambara Marthandan
Vettri as Prakash
Swapna Banerjee as Nithya
Shreya
Kamali
Deepa
Malini Sathappan

Production
An ad-film maker, Nakamaneci, made his directorial debut through the project, announcing that he was set to make a "ghost thriller laced with youthful romance". Ram Saravana, who had earlier worked as a child actor in Thangar Bachan's Azhagi (2002) was selected to play the lead role. Through a common friend, the makers signed on actress Tanvi Ganesh Lonkar, who had earlier appeared in the English film Slumdog Millionaire (2008), to play the female lead role. Tanvi signed the film citing her interest in using the Tamil film industry as a platform to break into bigger films in Bollywood, citing the examples of actresses Asin and Genelia D'Souza. Tanvi learned Tamil to shoot her scenes. The actress's inclusion in the film was widely covered by the media.

Soundtrack

Reception 
The film had a theatrical release across Tamil Nadu on 18 March 2016. A critic from nettv4u opined that the film is "a one-time watch without great expectations", adding that "there was a lot of hype about this movie regarding its genre, however, the scenes that are supposed to be spine-chilling are not executed properly". A review from the newspaper Thinnai gave the film a negative review and criticised the film's screenplay.  The film was also reviewed by newspaper Maalai Malar.

References

External links
 

2016 films
2010s Tamil-language films